Yoon Yoon-su, commonly known in English as Gene Yoon (Korean 윤윤수; Hwaseong, 9 September 1945) is a South Korean business man. He is the current chairman of the sportswear company Fila.

Biography
Yoon graduated from Seoul High School in 1964, and Hankuk University of Foreign Studies Department of Political Science & Diplomacy in 1974. He started his career with Korea Shipping Corporation (KSC) before working in merchandising from JC Penney October 1975 to July 1981. He then worked for Hwasung Co., Ltd. till March 1984 as export director, then becoming chairman of Care Line Corp. From June 1991 until the present he has been the Chairman and CEO of Fila Korea Ltd., organising a buyout of Fila brand in 2007. He owns a stake in Fila that was estimated to be worth about $US830 million in 2019.

He is also currently executive vice chairman of Korea International Trade Association.

Book 
 The Reason Why I Get 180 million Won Per Year (내가 연봉 18억원을 받는 이유) (autobiography published in 1997).

References

External links
Gene Yoon's Korean blog 
Gene Yoon's English blog 

1945 births
Living people
People from Hwaseong, Gyeonggi
South Korean businesspeople
Seoul High School alumni
Hankuk University of Foreign Studies alumni